Vittjärv is a locality situated in Boden Municipality, Norrbotten County, Sweden with 445 inhabitants in 2010.
Vittjärv is home to sports club Vittjärvs IK, active in orienteering and football.

References 

Populated places in Boden Municipality
Norrbotten